Mahraun is a surname. It may refer to:

Artur Mahraun (1890 – 1950), German far right activist
Winfried Mahraun (1907–1973), German diver